Jorge Robledo (1500 – 5 October 1546) was a Spanish conquistador. He traveled in modern-day Colombia, Guatemala, and Peru and was executed by decapitation by order of Sebastián de Belalcázar.

Biography 
Jorge Robledo was born in the year 1500 in Úbeda, Jaén, Andalusia, Spain, with unknown parents. He is first mentioned in the historical chronicles as soldier in the army of Lorenzo de Aldana, who was sent north by Francisco Pizarro in 1539 towards the newly founded province of Popayán. He founded the cities of Santa Ana de los Caballeros (present-day Anserma, Caldas) on July 26, 1539, Cartago, Valle del Cauca (as Arma) in 1540, and Santa Fe de Antioquia in 1541, beating the Nutabe. After this, he spent three years in Spain where he married María de Carvajal y Mendoza, called La Mariscala. His wife was also from Úbeda. Robledo returned to the New Kingdom of Granada with his spouse and many relatives. Jorge Robledo was executed by decapitation on October 5, 1546, by founder of Popayán Sebastián de Belalcázar, in whose expedition he was a captain, over a dispute of the Governorship of these towns. His widow Mariá de Carvajal later remarried first Pedro Briceño and later president of the Audiencia Francisco Briceño.

Gallery

See also 

 Spanish conquest of the Chibchan Nations
 List of conquistadors in Colombia

References

Bibliography 
 

1500 births
1546 deaths
Spanish conquistadors
Andalusian conquistadors
People of the Italian Wars
History of Antioquia Department
16th-century executions by Spain
Spanish people executed abroad
Executed military personnel
16th-century Spanish people
People from Úbeda